Cascade Junior/Senior High School, also known as Cascade High School (CHS) or Cascade Jr/Sr High School of W.D., is a rural public high school in Cascade, Iowa. A part of the Western Dubuque Community School District, it serves grades 7–12. , it enrolled 360 students. The communities of Cascade, Bernard, Fillmore, and Temple Hill are in its attendance boundary.

Athletics
The Cougars compete in the River Valley Conference in the following sports:

Baseball
Bowling
Basketball (boys and girls)
Cross Country (boys and girls)
 Boys' 3-time Class 2A State Champions (1983, 1985, 1986)
 Girls' 7-time Class 2A State Champions (1983, 1984, 1985, 1987, 1988, 1990, 1991)
Football
Golf (boys and girls)
Soccer (boys and girls)
Softball
Track and Field (boys and girls)
 Girls' 2012 Class 2A State Champions
Volleyball
Wrestling

Notable alumni
Colin Rea, Major League Baseball (MLB) pitcher

See also
List of high schools in Iowa

References

External links
 Cascade Junior/Senior High School
 

Public high schools in Iowa
Public middle schools in Iowa
Schools in Dubuque County, Iowa
1976 establishments in Iowa